David Pearson Etter (March 18, 1928 – July 10, 2015) was an American poet. He was known for poems evoking small-town midwestern life. His most famous volume was written as 222 monologues in the voices of citizens of the imaginary community of “Alliance, Illinois,” which was based in part on his experiences living for many years in his adopted hometown of Elburn, Illinois.
 
Reviewing an early collection of his work, poet Lisel Mueller notes that Etter was “strongly influenced by Masters, Lindsay, and Sandburg, he is a chronicler of Midwest prairie towns and the disappearing race of semi-rural people, with their inarticulate dreams and dark secrets”. Poet Jay Paul noted that Etter converted colloquialism into “a poetic innovation that displays the variety and humor of midwestern speech.” 

Etter's poems have been published in eight foreign countries and translated into German, Polish, and Japanese. He published thirty books and chapbooks of his own poems, which were included in over 100 textbooks and anthologies. The literary journal Spoon River Quarterly published a special issue in 1983 devoted to Dave Etter, including an autobiographical essay, and interviews with the poet by Norbert Blei, Robert C. Bray, Victor Contoski, Jim Ellege, and Dan Jaffe.

Biography
Etter was born in Huntington Park, California. He received a degree in History from the University of Iowa in 1953. He served two years in the U. S. Army. At age 30 he settled in the mid-west, living in turn in Evanston, Geneva, Lilly Lake, and Elburn, Illinois. He was an editor of the Encyclopædia Britannica from 1964-1973. And was a manuscript editor at Northern Illinois University Press from 1974-1980.

Awards
 He won a Carl Sandburg Award for poetry in 1981-82 for the book West of Chicago. 
 He won a Society of Midland Authors Kenneth F. Montgomery Poetry Award in 1967 for the book Go Read the River.
 He received the Illinois Sesquicentennial Commission Poetry Prize.
 He won the Theodore Roethke award from the journal Poetry Northwest in 1971.

Key Works
Dandelions: New Poems. 2010. Red Dragonfly Press.

The Essential Dave Etter. 2001, Spoon River Poetry Press.

How High the Moon. 1996. Spoon River Poetry Press.

Selected Poems. 1987.

Home State. 1985. Spoon River Poetry Press.

Alliance, Illinois. 1983. Northwestern University Press.

Cornfields. 1980. Spoon River Poetry Press.

Open to the Winds". 1978.

Go Read the River. 1966. University of Nebraska Press.

References

Poets from California
20th-century American poets
American male poets
20th-century American male writers
1928 births
2015 deaths